U23 may refer to

 any of a number of 
 Under-23 sport, an age category for sports
 GE U23B/C, a locomotive produced by GE Transportation.